Troublesome Wives is a 1928 British silent comedy film directed by Harry Hughes and starring Eric Bransby Williams, Mabel Poulton and Lilian Oldland. It was based on the play Summer Lightning by Ernest Denny. The screenplay concerns two housewives who become embroiled with a foreign spy network.

Cast
 Eric Bransby Williams - Eric Paget 
 Mabel Poulton - Betty Paget 
 Lilian Oldland - Norah Cameron 
 Roy Russell - Alec Cameron 
 Reginald Fox - Maxwell
 Marie Ault - Aunt Mary

References

External links

1928 films
1928 comedy films
British comedy films
Films directed by Harry Hughes
British films based on plays
British silent feature films
Films shot at Nettlefold Studios
British black-and-white films
1920s English-language films
1920s British films
Silent comedy films